Amanda Jane Parker  (née Backhouse) is a British businesswoman, philanthropist, and government official. She was appointed as a magistrate in East Lancashire in 2005, focusing on overseeing cases of domestic violence. In 2015, she was appointed by Elizabeth II, in her capacity as Duke of Lancaster, as the High Sheriff of Lancashire. She was the eighth woman in Lancashire, and the twenty-second woman from a duchy county, to hold the office of High Sheriff. She was also the fifth member of the Parker family of Browsholme Hall to serve as High Sheriff of Lancashire.

Early life and education 
Parker was born Amanda Jane Backhouse on her family's farm in the village of Bashall Eaves, near Clitheroe in Lancashire. She was educated at Clitheroe Royal Grammar School before working for Lancashire County Council. She went on to read agricultural economics at Newcastle University before joinging Barclays Bank's graduate trainee program.

Career 
Parker manages her own business in computer systems and home automation and formerly owned a paintball company, which she founded after graduating from university. She also serves as the châtelaine of her family's estate, Browsholme Hall, which is the oldest surviving historic home in Lancashire. As châtelaine, Parker has worked to expand tourism at Browsholme and opened the house up as a wedding and conference venue.

Politics 
Parker was appointed as a magistrate in East Lancashire in 2005, where she focused on cases of domestic violence. She was later named as chairwoman on the family panel.

In 2015, Parker was appointed by Elizabeth II, as the Duke of Lancaster, to serve as High Sheriff of Lancashire, succeeding Barry Johnson. On 10 April 2015, she was sworn in to office at a ceremony held at County Hall, Preston. The Queen's Commission was read by Under Sheriff David Cam, in the presence of Commissioners Victoria Robertson and Georgina Noble, Officiating Magistrate Brian Linfield, High Sheriff's Chaplain Rev. John Brocklehurst, The Norroy and Ulster King of Arms Timothy Duke, and The Honorary Recorder of Preston and of The Lord Lieutenant of Lancashire Anthony Russell. After Parker made a declaration to "serve the Queen’s writs and execute the good laws and statutes of the realm", she was handed the Sheriff's Patent by Lord Lieutenant Charles Kay-Shuttleworth, 5th Baron Shuttleworth. She is the fifth member of the Parker family to serve as High Sheriff. Her banner, as High Sheriff, takes the Parker family coat of arms, green and gold stag heads with a chevron with a diamond lozenge to denote her marriage into the family.

Parker is the eighth woman in Lancashire, and the twenty-second woman from a duchy county, to hold the office of High Sheriff.

Parker's first inititive in office was launching a new website and using social media platforms to promote the work of the office of High Sheriff. In 2015, she spoke at a conference in Leyland addressing domestic abuse prevention in work places. As High Sheriff, she joined police officers on night patrols in Preston.

In May 2015, Parker attended civic ceremonies with the Lord Lieutenant of Lancashire, Lord Shuttleworth, when the queen visited Lancaster Castle as part of the 750th anniversary of the creation of the Duchy of Lancaster.

Volunteer work and philanthropy 
Since 1999, Parker has served on the Board of Governors for Thorneyholme Roman Catholic Primary School and, in 2002, was appointed as Chairman of the Board of Governors. She serves as treasurer of Lancashire Hockey Development Group and is a founding member of the Lancashire Hockey Umpires Association.

She has also volunteered with Blackburn Youth Zone, local women's centres, and the University of Central Lancashire. She is a patron of Nightsafe, a Blackburn-based charity that runs homeless shelters for youth.

Personal life 
Parker lives with her husband, Robert Redmayne Parker, and their two children, Eleanor and Roland, at Browsholme Hall, the Parker family seat in Bashall Eaves. The Parker family is part of the landed gentry, and historically served as the king's park-keepers of Radholme Laund in the Forest of Bowland. Her husband is the Bowbearer of the Forest of Bowland.

References 

Living people
Alumni of Newcastle University
English justices of the peace
High Sheriffs of Lancashire
Amanda
People educated at Clitheroe Royal Grammar School
Women sheriffs
Year of birth missing (living people)